...Until We Felt Red is the third album by American guitarist Kaki King, released in 2006.

Reception

Writing for Allmusic, critic Jeff Tamarkin noted King's change in direction on the album, commenting "...those seeking the imaginative, intricate acoustic playing that characterized King's earlier work need not, well, fret. Every track—notably "Ahuvati," "First Brain," "Second Brain," and the title track—is rich with gleaming guitaristry. What's different is that King, whose first notices came when she entertained New York subway riders, can no longer be described simply as a guitarist. From here on, she'll be watched as a complete artist.."

Track listing

Personnel
 Kaki King – guitars, vocals and things
 John McEntire – drums and things
 Dan Brantigan – flugelhorn
 Katie Cassidy – harp
 Matt Hankle – drums
 Fred Lonberg-Holm – cello
 Dan Mintzer – drums
 Kelli Rudick – array mbira

Production
 John McEntire – producer

References

Kaki King albums
2006 albums
Velour Recordings albums
Albums produced by John McEntire